Bradyfallotaspis is an extinct genus from a well-known class of fossil marine arthropods, the trilobites. It lived during the late Atdabanian stage, during the early part of the Cambrian Period.

References

Cambrian trilobites
Cambrian trilobites of North America
Paleozoic life of Alberta
Olenellina

Cambrian genus extinctions